Callús is a municipality in the province of Barcelona and autonomous community of Catalonia, Spain.

Demography
According to Spanish census data,

References

External links
 Government data pages 

Municipalities in Bages